Forma is a Latin and Italian word meaning "form, shape, appearance".
 
Both the Latin forma and the English form are used interchangeably as informal terms in biology:
 Form (zoology)
 Form (botany)

Other uses 
 Forma or Forma 1, group of Italian artists formed in 1947
 Forma, Numidia, a former Ancient city and bishopric, now a Latin Catholic titular see
 Forma (band)